Parcelles Assainies Arrondissement  is an arrondissement of the Dakar Department in the Dakar Region of Senegal.

It is divided into 4 commune d'arrondissements; Cambérène, Grand Yoff, Parcelles Assainies and Patte d'Oie.

References

Arrondissements of Senegal
Dakar Region